Kishore Shanthi Dhinakaran is an Indian actor, who has appeared in Tamil language films. He made a breakthrough appearing as a child actor, winning a National Film Award for his performance in Pandiraj's Pasanga (2009). He has since appeared in the leading and supporting roles in films, and won acclaim for his portrayal in Goli Soda (2014).

Career
Kishore made a breakthrough appearing as a child actor, winning the National Film Award for Best Child Artist for his performance in Pandiraj's Pasanga (2009). In 2017, he played the lead in Uruthikol. In 2019, he starred in House Owner.

Filmography

References

Living people
Male actors in Tamil cinema
21st-century Indian male actors
Male actors from Chennai
Indian male child actors
Indian male film actors
1994 births
Best Child Artist National Film Award winners